Portico e San Benedetto is a comune (municipality) in the Province of Forlì-Cesena in the Italian region Emilia-Romagna, located about  southeast of Bologna.

It is formed by three main distinct settlements:
Portico di Romagna,  from Forlì.
San Benedetto in Alpe,  from Forlì.
Bocconi, midway the two former localities.

Main sights
In Bocconi:
 Ponte della Brusia, an 18th-century three arch bridge.

In Portico di Romagna:
Palazzo Portinari, which, according to tradition, belonged to Folco Portinari's large, extensive family, father of the Beatrice Portinari described by Dante Alighieri.
Palazzo Traversari. The theologian Ambrogio Traversari was born here.
Ponte della Maestà ("Majesty Bridge", 17th–18th centuries).

In San Benedetto in Alpe:
 Acquacheta water fall on the river of the same name, also described by Dante Alighieri in his Divine Comedy (Inferno (Dante) Canto XVI, 100–101). 
 Monastery of St. Benedict, of medieval origins.

References

External links
 Official website
 RomagnaToscana tourism website

Cities and towns in Emilia-Romagna